Neope armandii is a species of satyrine butterfly found in Asia.

Subspecies
Neope armandii armandii (western China, Assam, Burma)
Neope armandii fusca Leech, 1891
Neope armandii khasiana Moore, 1881 (Assam to Myanmar, northern Thailand, Vietnam, Yunnan)

References

Satyrini
Butterflies of Indochina
Butterflies described in 1876
Taxa named by Charles Oberthür